The 1899–1900 Northern Rugby Football Union season was the fifth season of rugby league football.

Season summary
The Lancashire Senior Competition was won by Runcorn (from Cheshire) and the Yorkshire Senior Competition by Bradford.

Hull Kingston Rovers played their first season in the Northern Rugby Union this season. Their first match away at Bradford on 2 September ended in a 3-0 defeat.

Lancashire Senior Competition
Millom replaced Morecambe. Although participating in the Lancashire Senior Competition, Runcorn and Stockport were from Cheshire, and Millom were from Cumberland.  Runcorn won the competition and Tyldesley were relegated after finishing bottom of the league and losing the promotion/relegation match 22–8 to Barrow.

Yorkshire Senior Competition
Bradford won the competition.  There was no promotion or relegation as Liversedge won the promotion/relegation test match against Heckmondwike 11–2.

Challenge Cup

Swinton beat Salford 16-8 in the Challenge Cup Final at Fallowfield Stadium, Manchester played before a crowd of 17,864.

References

1899 in English rugby league
1900 in English rugby league
Northern Rugby Football Union seasons